A malfunction is a partial or total failure of a parachuting device to operate as intended.  Malfunctions may require a skydiver to cut away their main parachute and deploy the reserve parachute.

High-speed malfunctions

Pilot chute in tow
This happens with the popular throw-out deployment system where the pilot chute does not pull the pin and open the container or once opened does not exert enough force to extract the deployment bag from the container. It can be caused by pilot chutes with kill lines that have not been cocked during packing or where the kill line has shrunk through use and reduces the drag of the pilot chute. It can be caused by a mis-routed pilot chute bridle. It can also be caused by too large a deployment bag and canopy for the container, although deployment bags should be matched to the containers. The correct procedure with this malfunction is to deploy the reserve from a stable belly down position. If time permits, the skydiver might first attempt to bump their container to dislodge a trapped deployment bag. If this malfunction is temporary and clears, it is called a pilot chute hesitation.

Bag lock
This malfunction occurs when the deployment bag is extracted from the main container, but fails to release the canopy within. The correct procedure to handle the malfunction is to cut away the main and deploy the reserve.

Horseshoe
A "horseshoe" describes a malfunction where a parachute deploys, but remains attached to a skydiver by its risers and at least one other point.  This prevents the canopy from opening properly and the canopy and lines form a horseshoe shape extending from the risers up and then back down again to the other point where the parachute remains attached to or entangled with the skydiver.  This malfunction may occur when the closing pin of a skydiving rig is released from the closing loop and allows the deployment bag to separate from the container. Because the pilot chute is still stowed, the malfunction takes on the shape of a horseshoe.  This malfunction may also occur if the pilot chute or bridle connecting the pilot chute to the canopy becomes entangled with the skydiver.  It is possible, though rare, to experience this type of malfunction when one or more parachute lines entangle with or snag on some portion of the parachute rig.

Procedures for clearing a horseshoe malfunction
The skydiver may attempt to extract the pilot chute or clear the entanglement.  Extracting the pilot chute, while simple during the course of a normal jump, becomes a new challenge, because its location will have shifted due to the deployment of the main canopy.  Skydivers may wish to practice on the ground deploying their pilot chute with the main canopy out of the container in order to gain experience with this procedure.  If successfully cleared, the main parachute will likely fail to deploy correctly due to severe line twists.  However, the skydiver can treat this as a normal high-speed malfunction, release the main, and deploy the reserve.  Failing to clear the entanglement prior to deploying the reserve may result in a main-reserve entanglement.

Slider hangup
This malfunction occurs when the slider does not descend fully, preventing the canopy from inflating completely. 

If it is hung up near the top of the lines, the canopy will not provide sufficient lift or drag, and the rate of descent will be high. In this case one will need to cut away the main and deploy the reserve. 

If the slider hangs up midway down the lines, the canopy will inflate almost normally (and may or may not be safe to land in that condition). In this case, the slider can be usually "worked" the rest of the way down by pulling on the rear risers, or by releasing the steering lines ("brakes") and pulling them down repeatedly ("pumping"). If the malfunction can not be cleared sufficiently and one decides to cut away, the decision to do so must be made at a high enough altitude to allow the reserve to deploy.

Low-speed malfunctions

Line over
This malfunction occurs when one or more of the canopy's lines pass in front of the nose prior to inflation. This causes the canopy to open in a "Bow-tie" shape. The result is generally an uncontrollable spin. The correct procedure to handle the malfunction is to cut away although it is sometimes possible to clear the malfunction by collapsing the parachute and letting the line pass back into the right position.

Two canopies out
Since a sport skydiver jumps with a main and a reserve parachute, it is possible for both parachutes to deploy.  This often occurs when a skydiver employing an Automatic Activation Device (AAD) deploys the main canopy at an altitude low enough for the AAD to activate.  This may result in a dangerous main-reserve entanglement.  More commonly, the two canopies will arrange themselves in a biplane, side by side, or a dangerous downplane configuration. Having two deployed parachutes side by side can create considerably more lift to the point of becoming dangerously hard to control.  One should always attempt to fly the canopy more overhead.

Safely Landing a two-out scenario

The two canopies will arrange themselves into a biplane or side by side. At any point it can shift into a down plane (See Image), which will accelerate the parachutist quickly downwards. One should NOT cutaway while under two canopies due to risk of entanglement of the parachutes, unless the canopies begin to shift into a down plane. The moment the canopies are pulling apart from each other is when you cut away.

Line twist
This is where a parachute twists around the vertical axis on deployment. This causes the parachute to only partially open especially if the slider is above the line twists. If a skydiver is unable to kick out of the line twists (rotating his body to untwist the lines) he or she will have to cut away.

Closed end cells
This is when the parachute is open, but the end cells have not yet inflated.  This can usually be cleared by just waiting, and they will self-inflate, or one can pull gently on the rear risers, or, as most people recommend, relaxing and pulling the steering lines down, as in a flare.

See also
"Blood on the Risers"

References 

Parachuting